Alcoholic cardiomyopathy is a disease in which the chronic long-term abuse of alcohol (i.e., ethanol) leads to heart failure. Alcoholic cardiomyopathy is a type of dilated cardiomyopathy. Due to the direct toxic effects of alcohol on heart muscle, the heart is unable to pump blood efficiently, leading to heart failure. It can affect other parts of the body if the heart failure is severe. It is most common in males between the ages of 35 and 50.

Signs and symptoms
Signs and symptoms presented by the occurrence of alcoholic cardiomyopathy are the result of the heart failing and usually occur after the disease has progressed to an advanced stage. Therefore, the symptoms have a lot in common with other forms of cardiomyopathy. These symptoms can include the following:
 Ankle, feet, and leg swelling (edema)
 Overall swelling
 Loss of appetite
 Shortness of breath (dyspnea), especially with activity
 Breathing difficulty while lying down
 Fatigue, weakness, faintness
 Decreased alertness or concentration
 Cough containing mucus, or pink, frothy material
 Decreased urine output (oliguria)
 Need to urinate at night (nocturia)
 Heart palpitations (irregular heart beat)
 Rapid pulse (tachycardia)

Pathophysiology 
Alcohol-induced cardiac toxicity (AiCT) is characterized as either acute or chronic. With regards to acute AiCT, it's believed that consumption of large amounts of alcohol leads to cardiac inflammation, which can be detected by finding large amounts of troponin in the serum. With regards to chronic AiCT, chronic consumption of alcohol (defined as greater than 80 g per day for at least 5 years) can lead to multi-organ failure, including myocardial dysfunction. The exactly pathophysiologic mechanism by which chronic consumption of alcohol causes DCM is not well understood, however it's believed that genetic mutation, and mitochondrial damage due to oxidative stress injury may play a role.

Diagnosis
Abnormal heart sounds, murmurs, ECG abnormalities, and enlarged heart on chest x-ray may lead to the diagnosis. Echocardiogram abnormalities and cardiac catheterization or angiogram to rule out coronary artery blockages, along with a history of alcohol abuse can confirm the diagnosis.

It's important to note that part of diagnosing Chronic ACM is noting the absence of coronary artery disease.

Treatment

Treatment for alcoholic cardiomyopathy involves lifestyle changes, including complete abstinence from alcohol use, a low sodium diet,  and fluid restriction, as well as medications.  Medications may include ACE inhibitors, beta blockers, and diuretics which are commonly used in other forms of cardiomyopathy to reduce the strain on the heart. Persons with congestive heart failure may be considered for surgical insertion of an ICD or a pacemaker which can improve heart function. In cases where the heart failure is irreversible and worsening, heart transplant may be considered.

Treatment will possibly prevent the heart from further deterioration, and the cardiomyopathy is largely reversible if complete abstinence from alcohol is maintained.

References

External links 

Cardiomyopathy
Alcohol abuse
Alcohol and health